Frank Meidell Falch (11 August 1920 – 15 December 2013) was a Norwegian media director.

He hailed from Kvinnherad. During the occupation of Norway by Nazi Germany he was arrested by the Nazi authorities in the end of June 1942. He was imprisoned in Ulven concentration camp. In November 1943 he was transferred to Sachsenhausen concentration camp, where he remained until the camp was liberated. He was transported back to Norway with the White Buses. After the war he took the cand.mag. degree in 1950 and the cand.philol. degree in 1951.

Falch served as the director of the Bergen International Festival from 1951 to 1957, and was then an editor and district executive in the Norwegian Broadcasting Corporation until 1990. He served as a member of Bergen city council for the Conservative Party.

He was decorated with the Defence Medal 1940–1945 and was a Knight of the Order of the Falcon. He was also a Rotary member since the 1950s, and edited their Nordic magazine Rotary Norden. He died in December 2013.

References

1920 births
2013 deaths
People from Kvinnherad
Mass media people from Bergen
Ulven concentration camp survivors
Sachsenhausen concentration camp survivors
NRK people
Politicians from Bergen
Conservative Party (Norway) politicians
Norwegian magazine editors
Knights of the Order of the Falcon